, abbreviated to OMU, is a Japanese public university that was established through the integration of Osaka City University (OCU) and Osaka Prefecture University (OPU) on 1 April 2022.

OMU was inaugurated with 1 undergraduate college, 11 undergraduate schools and 15 graduate schools. With the integration of the two universities, the number of students amounts to about 16,000, which is the largest scale in Japan as a public university. In addition, the number of OMU's freshman per year is 2,853, making it the third place in Japaneses national/public universities after Osaka University and the University of Tokyo.

Campus 
Osaka Metropolitan University has 7 campuses in Osaka.

† = from former OPU

‡ = from former OCU

Morinomiya Main Campus, to be completed in 2025.
Nakamozu Campus†
Habikino Campus†
Rinku Campus†
Sugimoto Campus‡
Abeno Campus‡
Umeda Satellite‡

Schools and divisions

Undergraduate Schools 
 College of Sustainable System Sciences (現代システム科学域)
 School of Literature and Human Sciences (文学部)
 School of Law (法学部)
 School of Economics (経済学部)
 School of Business (商学部)
 School of Science (理学部)
 School of Engineering (工学部)
 School of Agriculture (農学部)
 School of Veterinary Science (獣医学部)
 School of Medicine (医学部)
 School of Nursing (看護学部)
 School of Human Life and Ecology (生活科学部)

Graduate Schools 
 Graduate School of Sustainable System Sciences (現代システム科学研究科)
 Graduate School of Literature and Human Sciences (文学研究科)
 Graduate School of Law (法学研究科)
 Graduate School of Economics (経済学研究科)
 Graduate School of Business (経営学研究科)
 Graduate School of Science (理学研究科）
 Graduate School of Engineering （工学研究科)
 Graduate School of Agriculture (農学研究科)
 Graduate School of Veterinary Science (獣医学研究科)
 Graduate School of Medicine (医学研究科)
 Graduate School of Rehabilitation Science (リハビリテーション学研究科)
 Graduate School of Nursing (看護学研究科)
 Graduate School of Human Life and Ecology (生活科学研究科)
 Graduate School of Urban Management (都市経営研究科)
 Graduate School of Informatics (情報学研究科)

Other Institutions 
 Osaka Metropolitan University Hospital

See also 
 Tokyo Metropolitan University

References

External links 
 
 Osaka Metropolitan University（@osakametuniv_en）• Instagram

Public universities in Japan
Universities and colleges in Osaka
Sakai, Osaka
Kansai Collegiate American Football League